Madhu is a 2006 Indian Tamil-language romantic drama film written and directed by K. Thennarasu, starring Jithan Ramesh, Priyamani and Ashish Vidyarthi. The film was released on 12 May 2006.

Plot

Madhukrishnan likes to roam on a bike. Mercy and Esther are friends and hostel mates. Mercy believes in Jesus and is kind to others. Esther is bold, well dressed, and teases everyone. One day, when Esther teases Madhu, he kisses her publicly. Madhu falls in love with Mercy at first sight when she rescued a puppy from the rain. Madhu often meets Mercy. He comes to the hostel and expresses his love to Mercy, but she denies his love. After examination, Mercy goes to her hometown Mahi, and Madhu follows her. Her father Siluvai owes to bring up his daughter to a good position. Madhu becomes Siluvai's favourite. Esther enters the scene with a much-changed character. Siluvai learns of their love affair, and his decision forms the rest of the story. In the end, Madhu and Mercy fall from a hill and die.

Cast
Jithan Ramesh as Madhukrishnan alias Madhu
Priyamani as Mercy
Ashish Vidyarthi as Siluvai
Vivek as Madhan
Jahnavi as Esther
Rekha as Jennifer
Seema
Nizhalgal Ravi
Thalaivasal Vijay

Production  
Three songs were shot at Thiruvananthapuram.

Soundtrack
Soundtrack was composed by Ilaiyaraaja. The songs were written by Vaali, Muthulingam and Na. Muthukumar.

Reception 
A critic from Sify wrote that "To call the venture childish would be an understatement. All said and suffered we feel sorry for 'Jithan' Ramesh and Priya Mani". A critic from Rediff.com wrote that "Give this one a miss".

References

External links 
 

2006 films
Films shot in Ooty
2000s Tamil-language films
Films scored by Ilaiyaraaja
Indian romantic drama films
2006 romantic drama films